Yitewushi Khan (伊特勿失可汗), personal name Duomozhi (咄摩支), was the last khan of Xueyantuo.

Little is known about Duomozhi's background, other than that he was a nephew of Xueyantuo's greatest khan, the Zhenzhu Khan Yi'nan.  In 646, during the reign of Yi'nan's son and successor, the Duomi Khan Bazhuo, Xueyantuo fell into a state of confusion due to a combination of attacks by the Tang dynasty, misrule by Bazhuo, and rebellions by the Huige. Bazhuo was killed in a Huige attack, and Xueyantuo forces collapsed. Some 70,000 people fled west and supported Duomozhi as the Yitewushi Khan. Under Duomozhi, they returned east to their old territory, but, with Huige having taken much of the old Xueyantuo territory, Duomozhi soon renounced the title of khan, sending an emissary to Tang to request permission to move to the area north of the Khangai Mountains.

Emperor Taizong of Tang initially sent the official Cui Dunli to try to comfort Duomozhi, but at the same time was concerned that if Xueyantuo were rebuilt, it would cause problems for Tang later. Meanwhile, tribes of the Chile confederation, which had previously been Xueyantuo vassals, did not want Xueyantuo rebuilt either and reported their fear of that event to Emperor Taizong. Emperor Taizong therefore sent the general Li Shiji with an army toward Duomozhi's location—with the instruction to accept Duomozhi's surrender if he wanted to surrender, and to attack if Duomozhi did not. Li soon arrived at the Khangai, and Duomozhi's assistant Tizhen (梯真) surrendered.  Duomozhi fled to the south into the canyon.  Li sent his subordinate Xiao Siye (蕭嗣業) to comfort him, and he surrendered to Xiao. Not all of his subordinates were willing to surrender, however, and Li attacked them, killing and capturing many of them.

In fall 646, Duomozhi was delivered to the Tang capital Chang'an.  Emperor Taizong commissioned him as a general. Xueyantuo was at its end. Duomozhi himself would die before Emperor Taizong's death in 649 and was said to have been mourned with honor.

Notes and references 

 Zizhi Tongjian, vol. 198.

Xueyantuo khans
Tang dynasty generals at war against Xueyantuo
640s deaths
Year of birth unknown
7th-century rulers in Asia